The Boston mayoral election of 1870 saw the election of William Gaston.

Results

See also
List of mayors of Boston, Massachusetts

References

Mayoral elections in Boston
Boston
Boston mayoral